Foothills Mall is an indoor regional shopping mall located in Maryville, Tennessee.  Foothills Mall features approximately 70 stores and restaurants. Adjacent to the mall is the Foothills Plaza complex which includes several additional restaurants and a Kroger.

Opened in 1983, Foothills Mall is the only shopping mall in suburban Blount County, part of the Knoxville Metropolitan Area. The mall was originally anchored by Maryville-based Proffitt's, a regional department store; Miller's, another regional department store that was a division of Allied Stores; JCPenney; and Sears, which closed in February 2019. Proffitt's and Miller's no longer exist.  The original Proffitt's space is now used by Belk, while the former Miller's/Hess's was demolished in 2011 to accommodate a new movie theater. 

The mall was renovated in 2006.

On June 4, 2020, JCPenney announced that it would close in October 2020 as part of a plan to close 154 stores nationwide. After JCPenney closed, AMC Theatres, Belk, and TJ Maxx are the only remaining anchor stores left.

References

External links
Foothills Mall Website

Shopping malls established in 1983
Shopping malls in Tennessee
Maryville, Tennessee
Buildings and structures in Blount County, Tennessee
CBL Properties
Tourist attractions in Blount County, Tennessee
1983 establishments in Tennessee

io:Maryville, Tennessee
pt:Maryville (Tennessee)